Two Worlds, is a 2019 Burmese family drama film starring Nine Nine, May Kabyar, May Myint Mo and Pyae Pyae. The film, produced by Golden Hour Film Production, premiered in Myanmar on October 10, 2019.

Synopsis
In a broken family, father Kyaw Htet;  Mother Eaindray and her daughter, who hates their father, live separately. On her grandmother's birthday, which is celebrated every year, Eaindray asked her husband to send their daughter Thu Thu because she was too busy with her work. What would happen to a poor father and his daughter on their way to a birthday party?

Cast
Nine Nine as Kyaw Htet
May Kabyar as Eaindray
May Myint Mo as Thiri
Pyae Pyae as Thu Thu

References

External links

2019 films
2019 drama films
2010s Burmese-language films
Burmese drama films
Films shot in Myanmar